Callum Wright (born 2 May 2000) is an English professional footballer who plays as a midfielder for Plymouth Argyle.

Early and personal life
Wright grew up in Huyton and attended Cardinal Heenan Catholic High School in West Derby. He grew up "idolising" Liverpool's Steven Gerrard, and served as a Liverpool team mascot at the Champions League semi-final against Chelsea in 2008.

Career
Wright spent his early career with Tranmere Rovers, Everton and Blackburn Rovers, before moving to Leicester City in February 2018. He moved on loan to Cheltenham Town in February 2021. In August 2021 he returned to Cheltenham Town for a second loan spell.

Wright joined Blackpool on 1 September 2022 for an undisclosed fee. He moved to Plymouth Argyle in January 2023.

Career statistics

Honours
Cheltenham Town
League Two Champions: 2020–21

References

2000 births
Living people
People from Huyton
Footballers from Merseyside
English footballers
England youth international footballers
Association football midfielders
Tranmere Rovers F.C. players
Everton F.C. players
Blackburn Rovers F.C. players
Leicester City F.C. players
Cheltenham Town F.C. players
Blackpool F.C. players
Plymouth Argyle F.C. players
English Football League players